Chief Samuel Ládòkè Akíntọ́lá  otherwise known as S.L.A. (6 July 1910 – 15 January 1966), was a Nigerian politician, aristocrat, orator, and lawyer.  He was one of the founding fathers of modern Nigeria, he served as Oloye Aare Ona Kakanfo XIII of Yorubaland and served as premier of Western Nigeria from independence in 1960 till his assassination in 1966.

Early life
Akintola was born in Ogbomosho to the family of Akintola Akinbola and Akanke, his father was a trader and descended from a family of traders. At a young age, the family moved to Minna and he was briefly educated at a Church Missionary Society school in the city. In 1922, he returned to Ogbomosho to live with his grandfather and subsequently attended a Baptist day school before proceeding to Baptist College in 1925. He taught at the Baptist Academy from 1930 to 1942,he was a member of the Baptist teachers Union and thereafter worked briefly with the Nigerian Railway Corporation. During this period, he became acquainted with Chief H.O. Davies, a lawyer and politician and joined the Nigerian Youth Movement where he assisted Ikoli and supported the latter to represent Lagos in the legislative council over the candidacy of Oba Samuel Akisanya,  who was supported by Nnamdi Azikiwe. He joined the staff of the Daily Service Newspaper and soon became the editor in 1943 with the support of Chief Akinola Maja, a shareholder, replacing Ernest Ikoli as editor. Akintola was also founder of Iroyin Yoruba, a newspaper written in the Yoruba language. In 1945, he opposed the general strike led by Azikiwe's NCNC and Michael Imoudu, earning the distrust of politicians like Chief Anthony Enahoro. In 1946, he earned a British scholarship to study in the U.K. and completed legal studies by 1950. He started his legal career working as a lawyer on land and civic  matters. In 1952, he formed a partnership with Chief Chris Ogunbanjo, Chief Bode Thomas and Michael Odesanya.

Political career
After he was trained as a lawyer in the United Kingdom, Ladoke Akintola returned to Nigeria in 1949 and teamed up with other educated Nigerians from the Western Region to form the Action Group (AG) under the leadership of Chief Obafemi Awolowo. He initially was the legal adviser of the group before becoming the deputy leader in 1953 after the death of Bode Thomas. He defeated Arthur Prest in the primary to succeed Bode Thomas. As the deputy leader of the AG party, he did not serve in the regional Western Region Government headed by the premier Awolowo but was the Action Group Parliamentary Leader/Leader of Opposition in the House of Representatives of Nigeria. At the federal level he served as Minister for Health and later Minister for Communications and Aviation.

Decisions over the direction of strategic alliances by the party, the adoption of democratic socialism as the party's platform and the battle for supremacy in the party led to disagreement between Chiefs Akintola and Awolowo. Akintola disagreed with Awolowo's decision not to join the coalition government. Akintola wanted to align the Action Group party with the Northern People's Congress. He also opposed the party's decision to adopt democratic socialism as its ideology, preferring a more conservative stance.

Criticisms
Akintola was accused by Chief Awolowo for trying to supplant him as Leader of the party. In May 1962 with the Western House of Assembly set to remove Akintola after the party had earlier passed a vote of no confidence in the premier in a party meeting, crisis erupted on the floor of the house. The AG party broke into two factions leading to several crises in the Western Region House of Assembly that led the central/federal government, headed by the prime minister Sir Abubakar Tafawa Balewa to declare State of Emergency rule in the region and Chief (Dr.) M.A Majekodunmi, the Federal Minister of Health was appointed as administrator. Eventually Akintola was restored to power (even though he had lost the legal battle with the Judicial Committee of the Privy Council then Nigeria's highest tribunal) as Premier in 1963. In the general election of 1965, Akintola won his position as Premier, not as member of the Action Group party, but as the leader of a newly formed party called Nigerian National Democratic Party (NNDP), which was in an alliance with the Northern People's Congress (NPC) the party that then controlled the federal government. His blatantly rigged election in 1965 was undoubtedly an immediate cause of the January 1966 coup in which he was slain.

Death
Akintola was assassinated in Ibadan, the capital of Western Region, on the day of Nigeria's first military coup of 15 January 1966—which terminated the First Republic. Also known as the "Young Majors Coup" or the "coup of the January boys", the coup resulted in the assassination of many leading politicians, mostly members of the Northern People's Congress.

Impact
Akintola was a dignified orator. In 1962 he was responsible for completing the founding of the University of Ife (a university which was later named after his political opponent - Obafemi Awolowo. While popularly believed, there is no verifiable evidence that Awolowo ever initiated or suggested the establishment of the University of Ife which was renamed in his honour). He was also involved in the development of Premier Hotel and other monuments.

Personal life
Akintola was married to Faderera Akintola and had five children, two (Yomi Akintola and Dr. Abimbola Akintola) of whom held Finance cabinet portfolios in the Nigerian Third Republic. Yomi Akintola also served as Nigeria's Ambassador to Hungary and Samuel Akintola's daughter-in-law, Dupe Akintola, was Nigeria's High Commissioner in Jamaica. His fourth child, Victor Ladipo Akintola, dedicated much of his life to ensuring the continued accurate accounting of Samuel Akintola's contributions to Nigeria's position on the world stage. He published many works including a biography that highlighted his father's love of country and lifelong commitment to its progress. Akintola's youngest child, Tokunbo Akintola, was the first black boy at Eton College and features prominently in the best selling book by the Nigerian author Dillibe Onyeama, Nigger at Eton.

Justice Ladiran Akintola, an Oyo State judge and former law lecturer at the Obafemi Awolowo University is Akintola's child born out of wedlock.

A number of institutions, including Ladoke Akintola University of Technology, Ogbomosho, were established in both the Oloye's home town and other Nigerian cities as a means of remembering him posthumously.

See also 
 Jacob Odulate

References

External links

 Samuel Ladoke Akintola and History
 Liste der Regierungschefs der Regionen Nigerias

1910 births
1966 deaths
People from Ogbomosho
Yoruba politicians
Assassinated Nigerian politicians
People murdered in Ibadan
Nigerian National Democratic Party politicians
Action Group (Nigeria) politicians
State governors of Nigeria
20th-century Nigerian politicians
Obafemi Awolowo University people
1966 murders in Nigeria